March for Life may refer to:

 March for Life (Washington, D.C.), an annual anti-abortion gathering held in Washington, D.C.
 March for Life (Paris), an annual demonstration held in Paris protesting abortion 
 March for Life (Prague),  an annual anti-abortion demonstration held in Prague
 March for Life and Family, an annual march against abortion held in Poland

Not to be confused with:
 March for Our Lives, a student-led demonstration in support of tighter gun control held in Washington, D.C.
 March of the Living, an educational trip to Nazi concentration camps in Poland

See also
 Walk for Life West Coast